Winter salami is a type of Hungarian salami produced according to a centuries-old tradition. Made from Mangalitsa pork and spices (white pepper, allspice, and others), winter salami is cured in cold air and smoked slowly. During the dry ripening process, a special noble-mold is formed on the casing surface.

Szegedi téliszalámi (winter salami of Szeged) gained European Union PDO status in 2007, followed by Budapesti téliszalámi, which gained PGI status in 2009. The Hungarian Ministry of Agriculture and Rural Development places many specific regulations on what can be called Szeged winter salami.

See also
 List of dried foods
 List of sausages
 List of smoked foods

References

External links
 Pick Salami and Szeged Paprika Museum
 Hungarian Winter Salami recipe
 

Fermented sausages
Hungarian sausages
Smoked meat